Elections to Hackney London Borough Council took place on 22 May 2014, the same day as the 2014 United Kingdom local elections.

Results

|}

Alteration of electoral wards of London Borough of Hackney

The Hackney (Electoral Changes) Order 2013 reduces the size of the council and creates new electoral wards.

The Local Government Boundary Commission for England began the process of changing the size of Hackney in 2012. The new warding arrangement for the elections in 2014 are as follows.

Election for Mayor

Under the Supplementary Vote system, if no candidate receives 50% of 1st choice votes, 2nd choice votes are added to the result for the top two 1st choice candidates. If a ballot gives a first and second preference to the top two candidates in either order, then their second preference is not counted, so that a second preference cannot count against a first.

Ward results

Brownswood

Cazenove

Clissold

Dalston

De Beauvoir

Hackney Central

Hackney Downs

Hackney Wick

Haggerston

Homerton

Hoxton East & Shoreditch

Hoxton West

King's Park

Lea Bridge

London Fields

Shacklewell

Springfield

Stamford Hill West

Stoke Newington

Victoria

Woodberry Down

References

Council elections in the London Borough of Hackney
Hackney